was a Japanese voice actress and chanson singer active during the 1970s and 1980s. Her most popular roles included Spank in Ohayō! Spank, Miss Alphonne in the original Cutie Honey TV series and Non (as well as Furu-Furu the cat) in Majokko Megu-chan. Other noteworthy roles included:  Danko-sensei in Kosoku Denjin Albegas; Kintaro Isu in The Song of Tentomushi, Tamu-Tamu in Temple the Balloonist; Hajime in Doteraman; Harubo in Ippatsuman; Shota in Plawres Sanshiro; Jacky in Jacky the Bear Cub; Mars (the Sphinx's daughter) in Unico in the Island of Magic; Teko in Mahou Shōjo Lalabel; Tera in Future Boy Conan; and Panny (Pamie) in Adventures of the Little Koala. In addition, she was credited with a number of minor or guest roles in series such as Devilman, Dragon Ball, Tokimeki Tonight, Gatchaman, Saber Rider and the Star Sheriffs, Alps no Shōjo Heidi, Dororon Enma-kun and Himitsu no Akko-chan.

Tsukase died on May 15, 1989, from rectal cancer.

Filmography

Television animation
1970s
Devilman (1972) - Gande
Doraemon (1973) – Debuko
Cutie Honey (1973) – Miss. Alphonne
Alps no Shōjo Heidi (1974) – Tinette
Majokko Megu-chan (1974) - Non Gou and Furu-Furu
Bannertail: The Story of Gray Squirrel (1979) – Banner
1980s
Ashita no Joe 2 (1980) – Chūkichi
Miss Machiko (1981–83) – Kame
Doteraman (1986) – Doteraman
Sakigake!! Otokojuku (1988) – Hidemaro Gokukouji

Original video animation
Birth (1984) – Village Girl/Child

Theatrical animation
Ohayō! Spank (1982) – Spank
Haguregumo (1982) – Ango

Successors
Kazuko Sugiyama – Tsurupika Hagemaru: Hagemaru
Yūko Mita – Himitsu no Akko-chan: Gammo
Chie Satō – Himitsu no Akko-chan: Goma
Akari Hibino – Super Robot Wars: , Chōdenji Robo Combattler V: Chie Ichinoki
Yuki Matsuoka – Super Robot Wars: , Chōdenji Robo Combattler V: Empress Janera
Yuri Amano – Super Robot Wars: , Getter Robo: Miyuki Saotome
Minami Takayama – Heidi, Girl of the Alps: Tinette
Hiroko Emori – Sakigake!! Otokojuku: Hidemaro Gokukouji

References

External links
Official agency profile 

1945 births
1989 deaths
Voice actresses from Kanagawa Prefecture
Japanese video game actresses
Japanese voice actresses
Deaths from cancer in Japan
Musicians from Kanagawa Prefecture
20th-century Japanese actresses
20th-century Japanese women singers
20th-century Japanese singers
Aoni Production voice actors